McAvan is a surname. Notable people with the surname include:

Bobby McAvan (born 1953), Scottish-Canadian footballer
Linda McAvan (born 1962), English politician